is a Japanese football player from Hokkaido Consadole Sapporo.

Career
On 26 July 2019, Nagasaka joined Hokkaido Tokachi Sky Earth.

Club statistics
Updated to 23 February 2018.

References

External links
Profile at Mito HollyHock

Profile at Consadole Sapporo

1994 births
Living people
Association football people from Hokkaido
Japanese footballers
J2 League players
J3 League players
Hokkaido Consadole Sapporo players
Yuto Nagasaka
J.League U-22 Selection players
Mito HollyHock players
Hokkaido Tokachi Sky Earth players
Association football defenders
Sportspeople from Sapporo